Alexander Semenovich Brod (born 1969) is a Russian human rights activist.

He was a member of the Public Chamber of Russia between 2008 and 2012 and is a director of the Moscow Bureau for Human Rights. He is a member of the Expert Council at the Ombudsman of Russian Federation.

Early life and career
Brod graduated from the Philology and Law faculty of the Samara State University.

Since 2001 he has been the director of the Moscow Bureau for Human Rights. The Bureau's declared aims include combating racism, xenophobia and antisemitism.

In 2004, the Bureau considered filing a lawsuit against Mel Gibson, the director of The Passion of the Christ, and the film’s distributor in Russia. Brod said "several Jewish organizations and individuals told us that the film fuels ethnic hatred and cultivates xenophobic myths about the Jewish people’s guilt for crucifying Christ". He also approved Russian military action against Georgia in 2008, saying that Russian troops prevented a genocide there.

Awards
In 2003, he received the Award for Contributions to the Development of Jewish Life in Russia from the Federation of Jewish Communities of Russia for his human rights activity.

References

External links
Biography
Moscow Bureau for Human Rights
Moscow Bureau for Human Rights

1969 births
Living people
Russian human rights activists
Russian Jews
Members of the Civic Chamber of the Russian Federation
Samara State University alumni